Amestigon is one of Austria's oldest black metal bands. It was founded in 1993 by Tharen (also of Dargaard and Dominion III) and Thurisaz. Both had been a part of the black metal band Abigor and members of this band still contribute as guest musicians on recordings on Amestigon releases.

History 
The band began by recording two demos, titled Mysterious Realms and Through The Ages We Preserve.... Both were recorded onto cassette format. These demos were enough to get them signed onto Napalm Records and a split CD with the folk metal band Angizia was made as their debut release. Also entitled Mysterious Realms, the split CD was released in 1996.

However the band themselves were experiencing difficulties, and maintaining a constant line-up proved a problem. After releasing the mini-CD Höllentanz in 1997, the band decided to part ways. This split also marked the end of their relationship with Napalm Records.

Tharen went on to form the innovative neoclassical band Dargaard, and the industrial band Dominion III, but in 1998 his interest in black metal was rekindled and he decided to reform the band. He got in touch with Herr Wolf who agreed to join the band in winter 1998 on guitars; shortly thereafter, Silenius (vocals) and Lanz (guitar and bass) completed the line-up with Tharen on drums and keyboards. Thurisaz left the band to eventually take over vocal and bass guitar responsibilities for Abigor.

The band released a promotional CD in 2000 titled Remembering Ancient Origins; it was a collection of songs previously unreleased from 1995 to 1999. It was limited to 100 copies and was released by the band personally with no record label involvement. This CD is now out of print.

The band's most recent release is a split CD with Hellbound, entitled Nebelung, 1384, released in 2002 through their new label Millennium Metal Music. At this time there is no new news about any future releases, except a short news piece on their official site that mentions two new mini-CD projects.

Tharen recently commented that the band may well be coming to an end soon. He claims that the band have not had contact in a while, and have not been working on new material. However he claims to be in communication with Thurisaz again after the split, and a possibility of a new line-up may be announced soon.

However, in 2009 the first full-length Sun of all Suns was released.

Members

Current line-up 
Tharen – drums, keyboard, vocals (1993-)
Silenius – vocals (1998-)
Lanz – bass, guitar (1998-)
Herr Wolf – guitar (1998-)

Past members 
Thurisaz – bass, guitar (1993–1997)

Discography

Demos 
Mysterious Realms – 1993 – demo
Through the Ages We Preserve... – 1993 – demo

Splits 
Mysterious Realms (split with Angizia) – 1996
Nebelung, 1384 (split with Hellbound) – 2002

EPs 
Höllentanz – 1997
Remembering Ancient Origins – 2000

Album 
Sun of All Suns – 2009
Thier – 2015

References

External links 
 
 Amestigon at Encyclopaedia Metallum
 

Austrian black metal musical groups
Musical groups established in 1993
Musical quartets
1993 establishments in Austria